Hymmi Lenita Aulikki Airisto (born 1 January 1937 in Helsinki, Finland) is a Finnish business leader, promoter of Finnish industrial and cultural exports, TV journalist and author.

Biography

Maiden of Finland
Airisto began her public career in 1954, when she became Maiden of Finland, nominated by the Disabled War Veterans' Association of Finland. Her duties involved raising funds for the rehabilitation of men, who had been severely wounded in the Winter War and Continuation War in the late 1930s and early 1940s, to help them return to a normal life.

Education
Working as a fashion model gained Airisto the financial means for pursuing academic studies in Finland and abroad. She earned a Bachelor of Science, BSc degree from the Swedish-speaking Hanken School of Economics in Helsinki, Finland, and studied TV journalism at the BBC and ITV studios in London, with RTF in Paris and with German TV channels in Hamburg, Munich and Berlin. Airisto also studied at Stanford University in California. Her studies concluded with practical experience at various TV studios in Los Angeles, including an internship with the show of Steve Allen. He also asked her to join him live on air to tell American TV viewers about Finland and Finns on the NBC channel.

Career
Airisto had a career as a TV journalist for over 30 years, and she has appeared on more than 300 prime time current affairs shows over the years. She has also produced, designed and carried out export promotions for both individual companies and the export industry in general all around the world, the first promotion campaigns aimed at the international media and customers taking place in the 1960s. Airisto has also given lectures based on her several books at universities, schools of economics and other academic educational institutions for many years.

Accolades
In 2008, Airisto's influence in Finland was verified by a survey commissioned from Taloustutkimus – she ranked among the ten most influential women in the country. Airisto has also been nominated as Woman of the Year and decorated with the Knight, First Class of the Order of the Lion of Finland.

Other
Airisto is a very public figure who often has been an opinion-maker in even very mundane things, such as style and etiquette. She is arguably best known to the public for having made wearing tennis socks with a suit socially unacceptable in Finland in the 1980s, a practice that up to then was a common practice for Finnish businessmen abroad. Later she has among other things criticized politicians, such as Matti Vanhanen, for insufficient language skills.

References

Sources
 Official Homepage

1937 births
Living people
Businesspeople from Helsinki
Finnish female models
20th-century Finnish journalists
Finnish writers
Knights First Class of the Order of the Lion of Finland
Finnish women in business
Miss Universe 1954 contestants
Finnish women journalists
Beauty pageant hosts
Models from Helsinki